Adam Clayton Powell III (born July 17, 1946) is an American journalist, media executive, and scholar who is the executive director of the USC Election Cybersecurity Initiative. He was USC's vice provost for globalization from 2007 through 2010.

Early life 
Powell was born in New York City in 1946. He is the son of Congressman Adam Clayton Powell Jr. and jazz musician Hazel Scott. His half-brother, Adam Clayton Powell IV, is a lawyer and politician.

Career 
Before joining the University of Southern California, Powell's career included positions at the Freedom Forum, NPR, CBS News, 1010 WINS, Quincy Jones Entertainment, and WHUT-TV.

Personal life 
Powell is the ex-husband of Beryl Powell, daughter of Eileen and John J. Slocum. This marriage attracted media attention as the union of two high-profile families of different ethnicities, his black, hers descended from early New England white colonists. His son, Adam C. Powell IV, is a materials scientist.

References

External links

Adam Clayton Powell, III interview on In Black America, November 1, 1987 at the American Archive of Public Broadcasting

1946 births
Living people
Powell family of New York
University of Southern California faculty
African-American academics
African-American journalists
Place of birth missing (living people)
American male journalists
American media executives
American people of Trinidad and Tobago descent